Club Franciscain is a football club in Martinique, playing in the town of Le François.

It plays in the Martinique's first division, the Martinique Championnat National.

Honours
Martinique Championnat National
Champions (19): 1970–71, 1993–94, 1995–96, 1996–97, 1998–99, 1999–2000, 2000–01, 2001–02, 2002–03, 2003–04, 2004–05, 2005–06, 2006–07, 2008–09, 2012–13, 2013–14, 2016–17, 2017–18, 2018–19. (record)

Coupe de la Martinique
Winners (16): 1954, 1969, 1986, 1987, 1990, 1998, 2001, 2002, 2003, 2004, 2005, 2007, 2008, 2012, 2018, 2020. (record)

Trophée du Conseil Général
Winners (13): 1997, 1999, 2001, 2002, 2003, 2004, 2006, 2007, 2008, 2009, 2017, 2018, 2019. (record)

Coupe D.O.M
Winners (6): 1994, 1997, 2001, 2003, 2006, 2007 (record)

Coupe D.O.M-T.O.M
Winners: 1998

Outremer Champions Cup
Winners: 2006

Ligue des Antilles
Winners (5): 1997, 2004, 2005, 2007, 2008 (record)

Caribbean Club Shield
Champions: (1) 2018

Standings Season 2021/22 

1- Caribbean Club Championship Qualification

2- Possible Play-off for CONCACAF League

7- Relegation to Martinique Promotion d'Honneur Régionale

8- Relegation to Martinique Promotion d'Honneur Régionale

9- Relegation to Martinique Promotion d'Honneur Régionale

10- Relegation to Martinique Promotion d'Honneur Régionale

Performance in CONCACAF competitions
CFU Club Championship: 2 appearances
1997 – First Round – Group 2 – 2nd place – 6 pts (stage 1 of 2)
2000 – First Round – withdrew from Group Phase (stage 1 of 2)
Caribbean Club Shield- Winners: 2018

CONCACAF Champions' Cup: 5 appearances
1987 – First Round (Caribbean) – Lost against  Defence Force 4 – 2 on aggregate (stage 1 of ?)
1988 – Second Round (Caribbean) – Lost against  Defence Force 4 – 2 (stage 2 of 4)
1993 – Semi-final (Caribbean) – Lost against  Aiglon du Lamentin 3 – 1 on aggregate (stage 4 of 5)
1994 – Third Round (Caribbean) – Lost against  CRKSV Jong Colombia 3 – 2 on aggregate (stage 4 of 7)
1995 – First Round (Caribbean) – Lost against  AS Capoise 1 – 0 on aggregate (stage 1 of 5)

The club in the French football structure
Coupe de France: 12 appearances, with any victories listed 
1982–83: (rd 7) Club Franciscain 2–1 Montpellier LPSC
1992–93: (rd 8) Club Franciscain 2–1 FC Bourges
1994–95: (rd 7) Club Franciscain 2–1 ESA Brive
1996–97: (rd 7) Club Franciscain 2–2 Trélissac FC (aet, 4–3 pens)
1999-00:
2000–01:
2002–03: (rd 7) Club Franciscain 2– 1 Olympique Noisy-le-Sec
2003–04:
2005–06: (rd of 16) SCO Angers 5– 0 Club Franciscain
2009–10: 
2014–15
2020–21: (round of 64) US Sinnamary 1–1 Club Franciscain (1–3 pens)

Current squad

External links
 2007/08 Club info at Antilles-Foot
 https://liguefoot-martinique.fff.fr/recherche-clubs/?scl=4250&tab=resultats&subtab=ranking&competition=383589&stage=1&group=2&label=1-TROPHEE%20GERARD%20JANVION%20(R1)
 https://liguefoot-martinique.fff.fr/competitions/

References

Football clubs in Martinique
Association football clubs established in 1936
1936 establishments in Martinique